Antonio Moreno Casamitjana (July 9, 1927 – July 31, 2013) was a Chilean Catholic archbishop.

Archbishop Moreno was born in Santiago in 1927, son of Antonio Moreno and María Casamitjana. As a youth, he participated in Parroquia Nuestra Señora de Andacollo, Santiago. Ordained to the priesthood in 1949, he was appointed bishop in 1986 and became archbishop of the Archdiocese of Concepción, Chile in 1989 and retired in 2007.

Notes

1927 births
2013 deaths
20th-century Roman Catholic bishops in Chile
20th-century Roman Catholic archbishops in Chile
21st-century Roman Catholic archbishops in Chile
Roman Catholic archbishops of Concepción